A  (also ,  or ;  or ) is an item of clerical clothing, a cap, worn by Eastern Orthodox and Eastern Catholic monastics (in which case it is black) or awarded to clergy as a mark of honor (in which case it is usually red or purple).

Description
A  is a soft-sided brimless cap whose top may be pointed (Russian style), flat and pleated (Greek style), or flat with raised edges (Romanian style). Typically, monastics receive their  either when they first become a novice or when they are tonsured. A monk or nun who has been tonsured to the Great Schema will wear a skoufia that has been embroidered with prayers, crosses, and figures of seraphim.

High-ranking bishops (such as archbishops and metropolitans) will sometimes wear a black or purple  with a small jewelled cross on informal occasions.

See also
 Apostolnik
 Biretta
 Kalimavkion
 Klobuk
 Koukoulion
 The Philippi Collection
 Taqiyah
 Zucchetto

Citations

General bibliography

External links

 Monk wearing Russian-style skufia
 Monks wearing Greek-style skufias (JPEG)
 Schemamonk in embroidered skufia (JPEG)
 Pictures of skufias, information and literature 

Eastern Christian vestments
Hats